David Martin Chambers (born 6 June 1947) is an English former professional footballer who played as a midfielder or as a winger in the Football League for Rotherham United, Southend United and York City, and in non-League football for Folkestone.

References

1947 births
Living people
Footballers from Barnsley
English footballers
Association football wingers
Association football utility players
Rotherham United F.C. players
Southend United F.C. players
York City F.C. players
Folkestone F.C. players
English Football League players